Kostadin Assenov Gerganchev is a Bulgarian former football player, who played as a midfielder, and a coach.

He was born on October 25, 1971, in Blagoevgrad, Bulgaria.

He played for Pirin, Spartak (Plovdiv), Makedonska Slava, Sasa (Makedonska Kamenica) (Macedonia), Apollonia (Fier) (Albania) and Ptolemaida (Greece). Since the fall of 2006 he has been playing for Velbazhd Kyustendil. Finalist for the national cup in 1992 and 1994 with OFC Pirin Blagoevgrad.

References

External links
 Kostadin Gerganchev at sport.de

1971 births
Living people
Bulgarian footballers
Bulgarian expatriate footballers
First Professional Football League (Bulgaria) players
Bulgarian football managers
PFC Pirin Blagoevgrad managers
Association footballers not categorized by position
Sportspeople from Blagoevgrad

bg:Костадин Герганчев